Carl "Calle" Oscar Westergren (13 October 1895 – 5 August 1958) was a Swedish wrestler who competed in the 1920, 1924, 1928, and 1932 Summer Olympics. He won gold medals in Greco-Roman wrestling in 1920, 1924 and 1932; in 1924 he also finished sixth in freestyle wrestling.

In Greco-Roman wrestling Westergren also won the world middleweight title in 1922, as well as three European titles in different weight classes: middleweight in 1925, light-heavyweight in 1930, and unlimited in 1931. He worked as a bus driver and had two elder brothers who also trained in wrestling. He later became a keen pigeon breeder.

References

External links

 

1895 births
1958 deaths
Sportspeople from Malmö
Swedish male sport wrestlers
Olympic wrestlers of Sweden
Wrestlers at the 1920 Summer Olympics
Wrestlers at the 1924 Summer Olympics
Wrestlers at the 1928 Summer Olympics
Wrestlers at the 1932 Summer Olympics
Olympic gold medalists for Sweden
Olympic medalists in wrestling
Medalists at the 1920 Summer Olympics
Medalists at the 1924 Summer Olympics
Medalists at the 1932 Summer Olympics
World Wrestling Championships medalists
European Wrestling Championships medalists
20th-century Swedish people